North Tanami Band are a reggae/ska band from Lajamanu, a town located about 600 km to the north of Yuendumu. The members are Warlpiri and their songs are sung in Warlpiri and English. They were the subjects of the documentary The Traveling Warlpiris (1992).

Discography 
Albums
 Warlpiri Warlpiri people (1990) - CAAMA Music
 Travelling Warlpiri (1995) - CAAMA Music
 Warlpiri Tribe (2005) - CAAMA Music
 This Land - CAAMA Music
 Land is our Life (2003) - CAAMA Music

References

External links 
Myspace page

Northern Territory musical groups
Indigenous Australian musical groups
Warlpiri people